is  the former Head coach of the Iwate Big Bulls in the Japanese B.League.

Head coaching record

|- 
| style="text-align:left;"|Hyogo Storks
| style="text-align:left;"|2014-15
| 36||8||28|||| style="text-align:center;"|4th in Western|||-||-||-||
| style="text-align:center;"|-

|- 
|- 
| style="text-align:left;"|Nishinomiya Storks
| style="text-align:left;"|2015-16
| 54||13||41|||| style="text-align:center;"|11th|||-||-||-||
| style="text-align:center;"|-

|- 
|- 
| style="text-align:left;"|Iwate Big Bulls
| style="text-align:left;"|2016-17
| 60||15||45|||| style="text-align:center;"|6th in B2 Eastern |||-||-||-||
| style="text-align:center;"|-

|- 
| style="text-align:left;"|Iwate Big Bulls
| style="text-align:left;"|2017
| 28||2||26|||| style="text-align:center;"|Fired |||-||-||-||
| style="text-align:center;"|-
|-

References

1981 births
Living people
People from Awara, Fukui
Iwate Big Bulls coaches
Japanese basketball coaches
Nishinomiya Storks coaches